Anastasia Bayandina (born 1 November 1996) is a Russian synchronised swimmer.

She won a gold medal in the team free routine competition at the 2018 European Aquatics Championships.

References

1996 births
Living people
Russian synchronized swimmers
European Aquatics Championships medalists in synchronised swimming